Captain Salvation is a 1927 American silent drama film directed by John S. Robertson and released by MGM. It stars Lars Hanson, Pauline Starke and Marceline Day. On January 18, 2010 the film had its first home video release on the Warner Archives series.

Plot summary

Cast
 Lars Hanson as Anson Campbell
 Marceline Day as Mary Phillips
 Pauline Starke as Bess Morgan
 Ernest Torrence as Captain
 George Fawcett as Zeke Crosby
 Sam De Grasse as Peter Campbell
 Jay Hunt as Nathan Phillips
 Eugenie Besserer as Mrs. Buxom
 Eugenie Forde as Mrs. Bellows
 Flora Finch as Mrs. Snifty
 James A. Marcus as Old Sea Salt

References

External links
 
 
 
 
 line drawn period advertisement

1927 films
American silent feature films
Films directed by John S. Robertson
American black-and-white films
Metro-Goldwyn-Mayer films
1927 drama films
Silent American drama films
1920s American films